Geek speak may refer to:
Leet
GeekSpeak, a California radio program